In fashion, an accessory is an item used to contribute, in a secondary manner, to an individual's outfit. Accessories are often chosen to complete an outfit and complement the wearer's look. They have the capacity to further express an individual's identity and personality. Accessories come in different shapes, sizes, hues, etc. The term came into use in the 20th century.

Types 

Fashion accessories can be loosely categorized into two general areas: those that are carried and those that are worn. Traditionally carried accessories include purses and handbags, hand fans, parasols and umbrellas, wallets, canes, and ceremonial swords. Accessories that are worn may include jackets, boots and shoes, cravats, ties, hats, bonnets, belts and suspenders, gloves, muffs, necklaces, bracelets, watches, eyewear, sashes, shawls, scarves, lanyards, socks, pins, piercings, rings, and stockings.

The type of accessory that an individual chooses to wear or carry to complement their outfit can be determined by several factors, including the specific context of where the individual is going. For example, if an individual is going to work their choice of accessory would differ from someone who is going out to drinks or dinner; thus depending on work or play different accessories would be chosen. Similarly, an individual's economical status, religious and cultural background would also be a contributing factor.

History 

In Victorian fashion accessories such as fans, parasols and gloves held significance for how women experienced gender, race, and class. In this era, there was a trend for women to adopt, or aspire to, a more leisurely lifestyle. Consequently, gloves were often used by women to cover their hands and mask any signs of labour.

During the early 16th century, in Italy hat badges were worn by civilian men of higher social status as a decorative item, in imitation of the cap badges worn by the invading military. Hat badges were often worn in conjunction with a decorative sword and hilt. Hat badges were fashioned after plaquettes and often depicted a scene with personal relevance to the wearer.

See also 

 Status symbol
 Fashion design copyright

Notes

References

External links 
 
https://megamallcityusa.com/product-category/fashion/accessories/

 
Clothing